Samina Peerzada (Punjabi) is a Pakistani film and television actress, producer and director.

Early life
Samina was born into an educated Kashmiri Butt family in Lahore, but was raised in Karachi, Sindh Pakistan. After graduating in commerce she chose to pursue a career in acting. After many successful years of acting in television dramas and minor roles in television advertisements Samina was cast in starring roles in several films.

Career
Samina started her career as model in 1974 and then she acted in several films including Nazdikiyan, Mukhra, Bazar-e-Husn, Shaadi Mere Shohar Ki and Bulandi.

She has traveled widely and has also performed in Oslo at The International Ibsen Festival. Her notable stage performances include productions such as Raaz-o-Niaz and Ibsen's A Doll's House.

Television plays to her credit include Zindagi Gulzar Hai, Meri Zaat Zarra-e-Benishan, Rehaai, Durr-e-Shahwar, Dastaan and Karobi.

Her first Hollywood film, The Valley, released on 2 March 2018. Alyy Khan, another actor from Pakistan is also starring in this film.

Peerzada made her directorial debut through Inteha, a critically acclaimed film addressing the social issue of marital rape. Subsequently, she directed the less well-received commercial film Shararat.

She is also the host of Rewind with Samina Peerzada on YouTube.

Personal life
She married Usman Peerzada, a fellow media personality, in 1975. The couple have two daughters, Anum and Amal. Their younger daughter Amal is a miniature artist.

Filmography
Actress

Television series

Telefilm

Film

Direction

Awards and recognition
Samina Peerzada's directorial debut Inteha received nine national awards. She was also conferred with a Lifetime Achievement Award at the Beyond the Mango Film Festival held in Bradford, UK, in November 2013. She consecutively won the Hum Award for Best Supporting Actress in 2013 and 2014 forRoshan Sitara and Zindagi Gulzar Hai. She was decorated with the Lifetime Achievement Award for Excellence in Television by Hum TV at the 3rd Hum Awards held in Dubai in April 2015.

Nigar Awards

PTV Awards

Lux Style Awards

Mango Film Festival

Hum Awards

Pakistan Media Awards

CPACT Canada Awards

See also 
 List of Pakistani actresses

References

External links
 

1955 births
Pakistani film producers
Urdu film producers
Pakistani film actresses
Pakistani television actresses
Nigar Award winners
Living people
Punjabi people
Pakistani people of Kashmiri descent
Hum Award winners
Actresses in Punjabi cinema
PTV Award winners
Actresses from Lahore
Actresses from Karachi
Film directors from Lahore
20th-century Pakistani actresses
Actresses in Urdu cinema
21st-century Pakistani actresses
Pakistani female models
Lux Style Award winners